List of television stations in Washington may refer to:

 List of television stations in Washington (state)
 List of television stations in Washington, D.C.